Charles Smead (born August 4, 1951) is an American long distance runner, who made his most significant mark on the sport taking second in the Marathon at the 1975 Pan American Games in Mexico City.

Originally from Santa Paula High School in Santa Paula, California, where he was an outstanding 2 miler, taking second place at the prestigious Arcadia Invitational in 1968.

He continued to excel in long distance at Humboldt State University, where he won the NCAA Division II 6 mile/10000 metre Championship twice.  In 1972 he began a string of three straight wins in the famous Pikes Peak Marathon, he added a fourth victory in 1976.  He has completed the race six times, the most recent as a 57-year-old.  He also won the Avenue of the Giants Marathon in 1974  In 1980, he was runner up at the Chicago Marathon.

In the 1970s he was one of the early luminaries of ultramarathoning, yet as a Senior athlete he is not above sprinting 100 metres.  He was twice ranked in the United States top ten in the marathon.  He continues to be active, winning the M60 division of the 2012 USA Masters 5 km Cross Country Championships in October 2012.

Smead has been credited with spreading the sport of ultramarathoning into Europe

References

American male long-distance runners
Track and field athletes from California
1951 births
Living people
Athletes (track and field) at the 1975 Pan American Games
Senior Olympic competitors
Sportspeople from Ventura County, California
California State Polytechnic University, Humboldt alumni
People from Santa Paula, California
Pan American Games silver medalists for the United States
Pan American Games medalists in athletics (track and field)
Medalists at the 1975 Pan American Games